Serixia assamensis is a species of beetle in the family Cerambycidae. It was described by Stephan von Breuning in 1958.

References

Serixia
Beetles described in 1958